The Supai Group is a slope-forming section of red bed deposits found in the Colorado Plateau. The group was laid down during the Pennsylvanian to Lower Permian. Cliff-forming interbeds  of sandstone are noticeable throughout the group. The Supai Group is especially exposed throughout the Grand Canyon in northwest Arizona, as well as local regions of southwest Utah, such as the Virgin River valley region. It occurs in Arizona at Chino Point, Sycamore Canyon, and famously at Sedona as parts of Oak Creek Canyon. In the Sedona region, it is overlain by the Hermit Formation, and the colorful Schnebly Hill Formation.

The Supai Group is coeval with the Hermosa Group of east and south Utah; the Hermosa Group extended southeastwards from Utah to Durango, extreme southwest Colorado, and adjacent to the Hermosa type section.

The Supai Group was originally designated as the Supai Formation by N.H. Darton in 1910 for exposures at Supai, Arizona. It was first raised to group stratigraphic rank by E.H. McKee in 1975, though it remains at formation rank at other locations where its subunits are difficult to distinguish.

Description
The Supai Group consists mostly of sandstone and sandy shale redbeds. These are sedimentary rocks colored by an abundance of the red mineral, hematite. The lowermost part of the Supai Group also contains thin beds of limestone. The Supai beds range from siltstones and mudstones deposited in a continental environment, which contain fossils of land plants and structure such as shrinkage cracks and raindrop impressions, to limestone beds deposited in a marine environment, which contains fossils of marine animals such as crinoids, brachiopods, and corals.

The group lies on top of the Redwall Limestone, which is composed of massive limestone beds. Geologists discern signs of erosion (a disconformity) between the end of deposition of the Redwall Limestone and the beginning of deposition of the Supai Group, which forms the boundary between the two units. The fossils found in the Redwall Limestone are also characteristic of the Mississippian Subperiod, while the lower beds of the Supai Group are Pennsylvanian in age. The Supai Group is likewise separated from the otherwise somewhat similar shale beds of the overlying Hermit Shale by a disconformity. The top of the Supai Group forms a prominent bench, the Esplanade Platform, above which the softer Hermit Shale forms a slope.

The disconformity between the Redwall Limestone and the Supai Group records a time of regional uplift, in which the Grand Canyon area was elevated by at least several hundred feet. These channels were later filled by sediments that are now assigned to the Surprise Canyon Formation.

The Supai Group was originally regarded as a single formation, but further study showed that there were three disconformities within this set of beds that could be traced throughout the Grand Canyon. The Supai was raised to group rank and divided into four new formations separated by these disconformities.

Formations
The formations of the Supai Group are, from oldest (lowest) to youngest (uppermost), the Watahomigi Formation, the Manakacha Formation, the Wescogame Formation, and the Esplanade Sandstone.

Watahomigi Formation

The base of the formation is a thin conglomerate layer, containing some brachiopods and other marine fossils. This formation records a marine transgression (an advance of the sea inland) from the west and northwest across the future Grand Canyon area. The sediments become less marine and more continental in character from west to east, and this formation contains relatively little sand compared with the other formations of the Supai Group.

Fossils in the formation show that deposition of the Watahomigi began in the very late Mississippian and continued into the early Pennsylvanian.

Manakacha Formation

As ocean levels rose, basins filled, and the Manakacha Formation was laid down (especially in the Grand Canyon). It represents a time when deposition of aeolian sand became more widespread. The Manakacha was deposited at about the same time as the Weber Sandstone was deposited in northeast Utah in Dinosaur National Monument region, northeast of the Uncompahgre Uplift. This was likely during the Atokan and Desmoinesian Ages of the Pennsylvianian.

Wescogame Formation

Following deposition of the Manakacha, widespread erosion again took place. This produced a gap in the rock record covering most of the Desmoinesian and the entire Missourian Ages. Deposition resumed in the Virgilian Age with the Wescogame Formation, beginning with another basal conglomerate bed. Further sediments deposited were more marine in character in the west and continental in the east. Vertebrate trackways are found in sandstones of the Wescogame Formation in the eastern Grand Canyon. The Uncompahgre Uplift became the source region for further continental river and stream deposits. In east Utah, the Honaker Trail Formation and Weber Sandstone were laid down at the same time.

Esplanade Sandstone

When deposition resumed, it was widespread and voluminous. As a result, the Esplanade Sandstone is the thickest and most widespread formation of the Supai Group, extending into southeastern Arizona and southwest Utah. It is likely coeval with the Cedar Mesa Sandstone deposited in eastern Utah.

Geologic sequence

The geologic sequences of the coeval Supai and Hermosa Groups.

 Supai Group
 4 – Esplanade Sandstone
 3 – Wescogame Formation
 2 – Manakacha Formation
 1 – Watahomigi Formation
 Hermosa Group, named for Hermosa Cliffs, north of Durango, Colorado
 3 – Honaker Trail Formation
 2 – Paradox Formation
 1 – Pinkerton Trail Formation

The Supai Group members were created from marine sequences of marine transgression, and regression which produced alternating sandstone, siltstone, and conglomerate subsections. The subsections are sometimes separated by unconformities, due to changing ocean levels, glaciation, or regional subsidence. The ancient off-shore Antler Mountains supplied material from the west of the ancestral West Coast. The North American continent supplied material from the east. Three other basins were formed at the same time: the Paradox Basin of eastern Utah, the Central Colorado Basin in Colorado, and the Oquirrh Basin in northwest Utah.

Because marine transgressions cover distances, over time, the coeval units are separated by distance, and type of deposition material; the local subsidence, or uplift, as well as glaciation, and sea level changes, can cause variations in the deposition sequences of transgression-regressions. The ocean was to the west of the proto-North American continent, but also northwest, or southwest.

History of investigation
The Supai Formation was first designated by N.H. Darton in 1910 for exposures at Supai, Arizona. Darton assigned the lower beds of G.K. Gilbert's (since abandoned) Aubrey Group to the Supai Formation, at the same time assigning the overlying gray sandstone beds to the Coconino Sandstone. In 1922, L.F. Noble reassigned the uppermost shale beds of the original Supai Group to the Hermit Shale, based on the disconformity between the two. The formation was subsequently traced west into the Great Basin in Nevada and California and across much of Arizona.

In 1975, E.D. McKee first proposed raising the formation to group stratigraphic rank and divided the group into four formations in the Grand Canyon. The unit remains at formation rank to the east and in other areas where the contacts between these formations become indistinguishable.

See also

 Escalante Butte
 Geology of the Grand Canyon area
 Marine transgression
 Stratigraphy
 The Howlands Butte
 Whites Butte

References

Further reading

External links

Geologic groups of Arizona
Geologic groups of Utah
Colorado Plateau
Natural history of the Grand Canyon
Carboniferous Arizona
Carboniferous geology of Nevada
Permian Arizona
Permian geology of Nevada
Carboniferous System of North America
Cisuralian Series of North America